Avard may refer to:

People

Personal name
Avard Longley Davidson, Canadian politician
Avard Fairbanks, American sculptor
Avard Longley, Canadian politician
Avard Moncur, Bahamian athlete

Surname
François Avard, Canadian television writer
Sampson Avard, American Mormon splinter group leader

Place
Avard, Oklahoma